Christie Ward is an English professional footballer who plays as a midfielder for Hungerford Town, on loan from  club Wycombe Wanderers.

Career
Ward graduated through the Pro Direct Academy and was with Wessex League club Brockenhurst from the ages of sixteen to eighteen, scoring 19 goals in 50 appearances during the 2021–22 season, including the FA Vase's goal of the tournament against Brimscombe & Thrupp in the second round. He signed with Wycombe Wanderers on 12 July 2022. He made his first-team debut in an EFL Trophy match on 18 October 2022, after coming on as an 89th-minute substitute for Adam Leathers in a 1–1 draw with Peterborough United at Adams Park. On 11 November 2022, Ward joined National League South side Hungerford Town on a one-month loan deal. On 7 March 2023, Ward was recalled, leaving Hungerford after making 15 appearances.

Career statistics

References

External links

Living people
Welsh footballers
Association football midfielders
Brockenhurst F.C. players
Wycombe Wanderers F.C. players
Hungerford Town F.C. players
National League (English football) players
Year of birth missing (living people)
Wessex Football League players